The 1957 Army Cadets football team represented the United States Military Academy in the 1957 NCAA University Division football season. In their 17th year under head coach Earl Blaik, the independent Cadets compiled a 7–2 record and outscored their opponents 251 to 129.

In the annual Army–Navy Game at Philadelphia, the Cadets lost 14–0 to the Midshipmen; Army's other loss was in the same stadium, by two points to Notre Dame in mid-October. 
 
Two Army players were honored on the All-America Team; sophomore back Bob Anderson was a consensus first-team selection, and center Jim Kernan was a second-team selection of the International News Service (INS).

Schedule

Personnel

References

Army
Army Black Knights football seasons
Army Cadets football